Mestlin is a municipality  in the Ludwigslust-Parchim district, in Mecklenburg-Vorpommern, Germany.
In the 1950s it was desired to make a socialist model village of it. So the Marx-Engels-Place was built, framed by shops, blocks of flats, a large school building and a monumental neoclassicist "Kulturhaus" (hall for public events).

Gallery

References

Ludwigslust-Parchim